Sanchezia parviflora is a species of plant in the family Acanthaceae. It is endemic to Ecuador.  Its natural habitats are subtropical or tropical moist lowland forests and subtropical or tropical moist montane forests. It is threatened by habitat loss.

Distribution

Sanchezia parviflora are widely distributed and known from 13 subpopulations in Costa, Sierra, and Oriente regions. It is a strub of piemontano coastal and amazonian forest that is found at an elevational of 0–1,500 meters.

Threats
Aside from habitat destruction, there are no threats known to this plant.

References

Flora of Ecuador
parviflora
Least concern plants
Taxonomy articles created by Polbot